Robert Nicholson may refer to:
 Robert Nicholson (baritone), Australian singer
 Robert Nicholson (Indian Army officer) (1745–1821), British military officer in Bombay
 Robert Nicholson (judge), Australian jurist
 Robert Nicholson (piper) (1798–1842), Northumbrian piper
 Robert B. Nicholson (1863–1917), businessman in Kalgoorlie, Western Australia
 Rob Nicholson (musician) (born 1969), also known as "Blasko", American rock music performer
 Rob Nicholson (born 1952), Canadian Member of Parliament
 Bobby Nicholson (1918–1993), American musician and actor

See also
 Bob Nicholson (disambiguation)